Joseph Sneed may refer to:
Joseph D. Sneed (born 1938), American physicist
Joseph P. Sneed (1804–1881), American Christian minister
Joseph Tyree Sneed III (1920–2008), American jurist

See also
 Joseph (disambiguation)
 Sneed (disambiguation)